The Bangladesh–India border, known locally as the Radcliffe line (IB), is an international border running between Bangladesh and India that demarcates the eight divisions of Bangladesh and the Indian states.

The Bangladeshi divisions of Mymensingh, Khulna, Rajshahi, Rangpur, Sylhet, and Chittagong are situated along the border. A number of pillars mark the border between the two states. Small demarcated portions of the border are fenced on both sides.

History

The Radcliffe Line was published on 17 August 1947 as a boundary demarcation line between India and Pakistan upon the partition of India. In the early years, Bangladesh was also known as East Pakistan. It was named after its architect, Sir Cyril Radcliffe, who, as chairman of the Border Commissions, was charged with equitably dividing  of territory with 88 million people.

Issues

 
The border is used as a route for smuggling livestock, food items, medicines, and drugs from India to Bangladesh. Moreover, illegal immigrants from Bangladesh cross the border to India. Because of a large number of illegal immigrants crossing from Bangladesh into India, a controversial shoot-on-sight policy has been enforced by the Indian border patrols. This policy was initiated with reports of violence between the illegal migrants and Indian soldiers. The border has also witnessed occasional skirmishes between the Indian Border Security Force (BSF) and the Border Guards Bangladesh (BGB), most notably in 2001.

In July 2009, Channel 4 News reported that hundreds of Indians and Bangladeshis were killed by the BSF along the Indo-Bangladeshi border fence during its construction. The BSF state that the fence's main purpose is to check illegal immigration and to prevent cross-border terrorism. In 2010, Human Rights Watch (HRW) issued an 81-page report which documented a number abuses committed by the BSF. The report was compiled from the interviews of abuse victims, witnesses, members of the BSF, and its Bangladeshi counterpart, the BGB. The report stated that over 900 Bangladeshi citizens were killed during the first decade of the 21st century, many of whom crossed the border for cattle rustling or other smuggling activities. However, the report also noted that some were killed due to "indiscriminate firing from across the border". The HRW called for a joint independent investigation to be conducted by both governments.

The Bangladeshi government has often accused the BSF of incursions into Bangladeshi territory, and indiscriminate shooting of civilians along the India–Bangladesh border. In a news conference in August 2008, Indian BSF officials admitted that they killed 59 illegals (34 Bangladeshis, 21 Indians, 4 unidentified) who were trying to cross the border during the prior six months. Bangladeshi media accused the BSF of abducting 5 Bangladeshi children, aged between 8 and 15, from the Haripur Upazila in Thakurgaon District of Bangladesh, in 2010. The children were setting fishing nets near the border. In 2010, Human Rights Watch accused the Border Security Force of the indiscriminate killings.  On 7 January 2011, BSF forces killed 15-year-old Felani Khatun after she became tangled while climbing the border fence during a return trip to Bangladesh.  Her body was left hanging from the fence where it was photographed, drawing widespread outrage.

In 2019, Bangladesh border guards shot at BSF personnel. They claimed self defence. One BSF officer was killed.

Border length by states

The breakdown of the length of land border by states is as follows, clockwise:

 Total 4096 km
 West Bengal 2217 km
 Assam 262 km
 Meghalaya 443 km
 Tripura 856 km
 Mizoram 318 km

Enclaves

There were nearly 200 enclaves and counter-enclaves that existed on both sides of the border up until 2015. The enclaves or chitmahals that ran along the border between the two nations were a longstanding feature of the region. The enclaves were reputedly part of a high-stakes card game or chess games centuries ago between two regional kings, the Raja of Cooch Behar and the Maharaja of Rangpur, and the result of the confused outcome of a treaty between the Kingdom of Koch Bihar and the Mughal Empire. After the partition of India in 1947, Cooch Behar district merged with India and Rangpur went to then-East Pakistan, which became Bangladesh in 1971.

The prime ministers of India and Bangladesh signed a Land Boundary Agreement in 1974 to exchange all enclaves and simplify the international border. In 1974 Bangladesh approved the proposed Land Boundary Agreement, but India did not ratify it. In 2011 the two countries again agreed to exchange enclaves and adverse possessions. A revised version of the agreement was finally adopted by the two countries when the Parliament of India passed the 119th Amendment to the Indian Constitution on 7 May 2015.

Inside the main part of Bangladesh, there were 111 Indian enclaves (17,160.63 acres), while inside the main part of India, there were 51 Bangladeshi enclaves (7,110.02 acres).  Under the Land Boundary Agreement, the enclave residents could continue to reside at their present location or move to the country of their choice. The adverse possession of Boraibari went to Bangladesh. The undemarcated borders between the nations were also finally solved with respect to Daikhata-Dumabari, Muhurichar (an island in the Muhuri River), and Pyrdiwah.

Maritime boundary
 

India and Bangladesh, with different perceptions of their maritime boundaries and exclusive economic zone, engaged in eight rounds of bilateral negotiations since 1974, which remained inconclusive until 2009 when both agreed to undergo arbitration under the UNCLOS. On 7 July 2014, Arbitration Tribunal resolved the dispute in Bangladesh's favor, which was amicably accepted by both sides, thus ending the dispute. Dispute also included South Talpatti (also called "New Moore"), a small uninhabited offshore sandbar that emerged as an Island in the aftermath of the Bhola cyclone in 1970, and disappeared around March 2010.

Cross-border transport

Road links & official crossing points 

Designated Integrated Check Posts (ICP, with both customs and immigration facilities) and Land Customs Stations (LCS) are:

 Assam
 Mankachar Land Customs Stations(India) and Rowmari post (Bangladesh)
 Karimganj–Beanibazar Upazila via Sutarkandi integrated checkpost crossing on NH37(India) and Sheola post (Bangladesh)
 Karimganj Steamer and Ferry Station (KSFS) Land Customs Stations(India) and Zakiganj post (Bangladesh)

 West Bengal
 Kolkata–Dhaka via Petrapole-Benapole integrated checkpost crossing
 Malda–Rajshahi via Mahadipur crossing
 Changrabandha integrated checkpost
 Hili

 Meghalaya
 Bagmara Land Customs Stations (India) and Bijoyour post (Bangladesh)
 Borsara Land Customs Stations(India) and Borsara post (Bangladesh)
 West Garo Hills–Bakshiganj via Mahendraganj crossing on NH12
 Tura–Nalitabari via Dalu crossing on NH217 (India) and Nakugaon post (Bangladesh)
 Shillong–Sylhet via Dawki integrated checkpost crossing (India) and Tamabil post (Bangladesh)

 Tripura
 Agartala–Dhaka via Agartala integrated checkpost (India) and Akhaura checkpost crossing
 Santirbazar–Feni via Santirbazar integrated border checkpost road and railway crossing in South Tripura district

 Mizoram
 Kawarpuchiah integrated checkpost, opened in October 2017 by Prime Minister Narendra Modi.

Bus service 

Transport between India and Bangladesh bears much historical and political significance for both countries, which possessed no ground transport links for 43 years, starting with the partition of Bengal and India in 1947. After the establishment of Bangladesh following the Indo-Pakistani War of 1971, bilateral relations improved considerably, but the two governments moved slowly on implementing a 1980 agreement on improving transport links.

The Kolkata–Dhaka Bus started in 1999. In 2001, another bus service was launched to connect Dhaka with Agartala, the capital of the Indian state of Tripura, the second-largest city of Northeast India that borders Bangladesh in the east. In 2015 June direct bus service from Kolkata to Agartala via, Petrapole, Dhaka, Akhoura began. The service is operated by West Bengal surface transport corporation.

India–Bangladesh rail links

Before partition India and Bangladesh had multiple rail links. In the 21st century, the countries are only connected by rail links on the Western Bangladeshi border, although there are plans to rebuild some of the other rail links. 2 scheduled passenger trains run between Kolkata and Bangladesh as the Maitree Express and the Bandhan Express.

Barrier

By November 2007,  of fencing was completed and the project was likely to completed by 2008-09. By March 2011,  of fencing was completed and the deadline was further revised to March 2012.

As per the press release from the Government of India, the sanctioned length of the fence along Indo-Bangladesh Border was  while  was completed by February 2018. By July 2019,  of fencing was completed. And by August 2021,  of fencing was completed. Fencing along remaining feasible stretches is yet to completed.

Border protection force

Border Security Force (BSF) is India's border guarding organisation on its border with Pakistan and Bangladesh.

See also 

 Tetulia Corridor
 Tin Bigha Corridor
 2001 Indian–Bangladeshi border conflict
 Bangladesh–India relations
 Border barrier
 Borders of India

References

Further reading

External links

 Map of India–Bangladesh border links
 India–Bangladesh border gunfire
 News from India

 
1947 establishments in India
1947 establishments in East Pakistan
1947 in international relations
Geography of Assam
Geography of West Bengal
Fences
Border barriers
Borders of Bangladesh
Borders of India
International borders